Jan Schokking (10 May 1864, Amsterdam – 15 July 1941, The Hague) was a Dutch politician and Christian minister.

He was party chair of the Christian Historical Union (CHU), mayor of Katwijk, an MP and also minister of Justice.

References
 

1864 births
1941 deaths
20th-century Dutch Calvinist and Reformed ministers
Christian Historical Union politicians
20th-century Dutch politicians
Mayors in South Holland
People from Katwijk
Members of the House of Representatives (Netherlands)
Ministers of Justice of the Netherlands
Chairmen of the Christian Historical Union
Clergy from Amsterdam
University of Amsterdam alumni
Vrije Universiteit Amsterdam alumni
Politicians from Amsterdam